The Geraint Thomas National Velodrome, previously known as the Wales National Velodrome, in Newport, South Wales, is an indoor arena located in the Newport International Sports Village, Lliswerry. The Velodrome's facilities including a covered 250-metre Siberian pine track, a function room/dance studio, free weights room, fitness suite, a drug-testing room and a multipurpose indoor sports arena.

It has seating for 500 spectators. The Newport Velodrome hosts the Head Office of Welsh Cycling and Newport Velo Youth Cycling Club is based at the centre.

An outdoor cycle speedway track home of Newport Cycle Speedway Club is located at the Velodrome.

The Velodrome was used by the British track cycling team for its pre-event holding camps ahead of the 2008, 2012 Summer Olympics and 2016 Summer Olympics.

It was announced in August 2018 that the velodrome would be renamed after the UK's third and Wales' first-ever Tour de France winner Geraint Thomas.

The velodrome will host the 2022 edition of the British National Track Championships.

References

External links
Newport City Leisure - Wales National Velodrome
Newport Velo Youth Cycling Club 

Cycle racing in Wales
Velodromes in Wales
Indoor arenas in Newport, Wales
Sports venues in Newport, Wales
Landmarks in Newport, Wales